Marlijn Binnendijk (born 12 May 1986 in Zuid-Scharwoude) is a Dutch professional racing cyclist.

Palmarès

National record, team pursuit

After the introduction of the women's 3000m team pursuit  at the 2007–08 track cycling season, Binnendijk was three times part of the team pursuit squad when they established a (new) Dutch national record. The first one was the first time the Dutch team rode the team pursuit. She is not the record holder anymore.

See also
2008 AA-Drink Cycling Team season

References

External links

1986 births
Living people
People from Langedijk
Dutch female cyclists
Dutch track cyclists
Cyclists from North Holland
21st-century Dutch women